Sigurd Evensmo (14 February 1912 – 17 October 1978) was a Norwegian author and journalist.

Career
He was born in Hamar. In his younger years he was active in Clarté, a student organization at University of Oslo and in contact with Mot Dag, a forum among the social democratic students (later the Student's Communist Organization). He then joined the Workers' Youth League and worked actively with them. He began as a journalist apprentice with Hamar Arbeiderblad and continued as a journalist in many weekly workers papers including Tiden in Arendal, Fremtiden in Drammen and Arbeidernes Pressekontor in Oslo. Finally in 1939 he began to work for the Arbeiderbladet.

During the war Evensmo was active with the resistance and he wrote for the illegal paper, Bulletinen until he was forced into hiding and finally to flee from Norway. From 1953 through 1959 he was the editor for the paper Orientering. He served as film critic for the Norwegian Broadcasting Corporation (NRK) from 1948 until 1962.

Before the Second World War he had written a play, Konflikt, in 1934. His first novel, published in 1945, was Englandsfarere. The theme of the book was based on Evensmo's personal experiences during the war. His trilogy consisting of Grenseland (1947), Flaggermusene (1949) and Hjemover (1951) are recognized as a major example of Norwegian post-war literature, and explore the social and psychological differences between the country and city cultures as well as the intellectual development of workers between the wars. Evensmo won the Kritikerprisen for the books, and at the close of the 1970s, the trilogy was produced for television by NRK. His novels Gåten fra år null, Femten døgn med Gordona and Miraklet på Blindern can all be categorized as science fiction; Evensmo was among the first to write in this genre in Norway. He also wrote the scripts for many films.

Prizes and recognition
1951 - Norwegian Critics Prize for Literature for the trilogy novels Grenseland, Flaggermusene and Hjemover
1976 - Gyldendal's Endowment
1977 - Nominated for The Nordic Council's Literature Prize (Nordisk Råds litteraturpris) for the novel Inn i din tid

Works

Books
1945 Englandsfarere, novel  
1946 Oppbrudd etter midnatt, novel
1947 Grenseland, novel 
1949 Flaggermusene, novel 
1951 Hjemover, novel 
1954 Glassveggen, collection of stories 
1955 Trollspeilet: streiftokt i film 
1956 Østenfor vest og vestenfor øst: Jugoslavia under Tito 
1956 Gåten fra år null, novel  
1962 Femten døgn med Gordona, novel  
1964 Feider og finter  
1966 Miraklet på Blindern, novel   
1967 Det store tivoli: film og kino i Norge gjennom 70 år  
1968 Norske forfattere i krig og fred: Den Norske forfatterforening 1940-1968, written with Alex Brinchmann
1969 Vold i filmene: ett års kinoprogrammer i Norge og noen perspektiver  
1970 Observasjoner, essay collection  
1971 Den nakne sannheten: sex i filmene  
1974 Gyldendal og gyldendøler  
1976 Inn i din tid  
1978 Ut i kulda

Drama
1934 Konflikt, play  
1952 Fredsprisen, radio play
1955 Blodveien, film script
1981 Stengetid, play

References

1912 births
1978 deaths
Norwegian newspaper editors
Norwegian Critics Prize for Literature winners
NRK people
People from Hamar
Hamar Katedralskole alumni
University of Oslo alumni
Norwegian resistance members
Mot Dag
20th-century Norwegian novelists
20th-century Norwegian dramatists and playwrights
Norwegian male dramatists and playwrights
Norwegian male novelists